Hajógyári Island (Shipyard Island, for the shipyard companies that once operated there) or Óbudai-sziget (Óbuda Island, or Island of Old Buda) is the largest Danubian island in Budapest. Located in District III, it is a popular recreational area, year round. It is the home of the international Sziget Festival every August.

Location and geography
Hajógyári was created from the debris carried by the Danube River. It was originally a reef island made up of two adjoining land masses. Buda's coast is located between the river markers of 1651 and 1654 kilometers. It has an area of 108 hectares, a length of 2750 meters, and a maximum width of 500 meters, which is directly in line with the 1653-kilometer river marker. Obuda Island is separated by a 70- to 80-meter wide branch of the Danube. Not far from the northern end of the Újpest railway bridge, the southern end of the Árpád Bridge connects Buda and Pest.

History

Early period
Originally known as Aquincum, by AD 89 it was home to a Roman legion of 6,000 men. A city grew around their fortress and became the capital of Pannonia Inferior in 106. By the end of the 2nd century, the population had reached 40,000. After 409, the Romans abandoned the area. A thousand years later, in the time of King Matthias Corvinus, it was a wooded hunting preserve, although many Romans ruins remained (and can still be seen there). In the 17th century, ownership passed to the Zichy family.

19th century

Its importance grew again in the 19th century, when Count István Széchenyi established the Óbuda Shipyard. The first ship built there, the rpád-steamboat, was launched in 1836. It became the first industrial scale steamship building company in the Habsburg Empire. Roman perimeter walls were first found in 1836, when the Otter Bay dredges deepened the shipyard.

Twenty-eight hectares (69 acres) of the island's area was occupied by the shipyard. The remainder of the island was converted to agricultural use. For a long time, access to the island was by ferry only. The first permanent bridge was built in 1858 after a pedestrian bridge had been constructed.

20th century
Around the 1900s Hajógyári was called the "Big Island". It got the nickname Shipyard Island because it was once the southern end of the Óbuda Shipyard. Industrial activity in these buildings ended and moved to different companies. The island's port is operated by the Yacht Club of Hungary. The former shipyard area was found at Hadrian's Aquincum of the Roman governor's palace, which was uncovered and presented to wait.

Carrot farms were still there as late as 1960. In 1967, the current reinforced concrete bridge was built. The park contained many playgrounds, which were burned down in 1999 and replaced in 2004. The six tennis yards are currently in a state of disrepair.

Present 
The island hosts the annual Sziget Festival  which has helped the island to achieve international fame.  After the fall of the Communist government, there were no longer any organized camps for musicians to meet up and play, hence a music festival was proposed as a way to bridge this gap. The festival was started in 1993, originally called Diáksziget (Students' Island) and organized by Károly Gerenday and Péter Müller Sziámi . This first event was organized by enthusiastic music fans in their spare time and ran well over budget, taking until 1997 to repay the losses. From 1996 to 2001 it was sponsored by Pepsi and renamed Pepsi Sziget. It has been called Sziget Fesztivál ("island festival") since 2002.

Future 

Recently, construction of a massive Ft 400 billion (€1.5 billion) hotel and recreation complex on the island has begun. To be developed by an international consortium by 2012, the complex will be the largest of its kind in Europe. The new complex will feature a conference center capable of hosting 3,500 people; three five-star hotels and four apartment hotels; a spacious, American-style casino offering many different kinds of games; and an entertainment complex, including a swimming pool. The total built-in area of the complex will be 32,000 m2, which is 10% of the total area of the island.

References

External links 
Hajógyári Island Events Hall
 Shipyard Island
 Dream Island
 Mesél Óbuda földje - Károly Guckler Conservation Foundation (Budapest; 1998.)
 Kaiser Anna - Varró József: Volt egyszer egy hajógyár (Budapest, Óbuda - Local History books; 1999.)
 Óbuda.lap.hu - Web Portal

Geography of Budapest
River islands of Hungary
Islands of the Danube